Beddgelert is a village and community in the Snowdonia area of Gwynedd, Wales. The population of the community taken at the 2011 census was 455, and includes Nantmor and Nant Gwynant. It is reputed to be named after the legendary hound Gelert. The community is large and sparsely populated  and covers 86 square kilometres.

Location 
The village stands in a valley at the confluence of the River Glaslyn and the River Colwyn. Just above the confluence of the rivers, in the centre of the village, is an old stone bridge with two arches. The River Gwynant also exists in the area, coinciding with the River Colwyn under what locals know as ‘Pont Bren’, creating the River Glaslyn. Many of the houses and hotels are built of local dark stone. To the west is Moel Hebog and its neighbours to the north and a series of hills rising to the top of Snowdon. A lane of the A4085 between Caernarfon (13 miles north) and Porthmadog (8 miles south) runs through the village.

The outdoor equipment company Gelert originated in Bryncir then moved to Beddgelert but later moved its headquarters to nearby Porthmadog.

History
The folk tale of the faithful hound "Gelert" is often associated with the village. A raised mound in the village is called "Gelert's Grave" and is a significant tourist attraction. But the grave was built by the late 18th-century landlord of the Goat Hotel, David Pritchard, who created it in order to encourage tourism. Similar legends can be found in other parts of Europe and Asia.
 
The village is probably named after an early Christian missionary and leader called Celert (or Cilert) who settled here early in the 8th century. The earliest record of the name Beddgelert appears on a document dated 1258, and the name recorded is "Bekelert". In a document of 1269 it is recorded as "Bedkelerd".

The Church of St. Mary stands at the end of Stryd yr Eglwys (Church Street). This was originally a part of an Augustinian Monastery (the chapel), but is all that remains since the rest of the monastery was burnt down during Edward I's war of conquest. Rebuilding was probably not completed at the time of the suppression of the monastery in about 1536. Parts of the building date from the 12th century and is still in active use today.

Economy and attractions 

Beddgelert is a significant tourist attraction, its picturesque bridge crossing the River Colwyn just upstream of its confluence with the River Glaslyn. It is also the nearest village to the scenic Glaslyn gorge, an area of tumultuous river running between steep wooded hills. Much of the area is, however, becoming invaded by the alien plant, Rhododendron ponticum which provides a covering of pink blossom in May and June, but which is slowly blanketing out the native flora. Attempts have been made to control its spread by cutting and burning.

River levels on the River Glaslyn in Beddgelert are constantly monitored by the Natural Resources Wales, in order to give advance warning of flood conditions lower down the valley.

Beddgelert has a range of hotels with public bars, guesthouses, cafes, and restaurants. The car park in the village provides the easiest access route for climbing Moel Hebog, the mountain which directly overlooks the village.

Part of the restored Welsh Highland Railway runs through the village. In April 2009 the railway station was reopened to the public. The line links the village with Caernarfon to the north and Porthmadog to the south.

Other local attractions include the Sygun Copper Mine.

The village is also linked with the Rupert Bear stories, as Alfred Bestall wrote and illustrated some of the stories whilst he lived in the village, in a cottage at the foot of Mynydd Sygun. There is even a small area known as ‘Rupert Garden’ in the village, dedicated to the Bear; a short walk from Alfred Bestall's old home.

Many films have made use of the scenery around Beddgelert; most notably The Inn of the Sixth Happiness, starring Ingrid Bergman. Other more modern films such as Tomb Raider 2: Lara Croft and the Cradle of Life have also been filmed here; starring Angelina Jolie.

Notable Locals 
 Renowned bards who lived in the area in the 15th–16th centuries include Rhys Goch Eryri (fl.1385–1448), Dafydd Nanmor (fl.1450–1490) and Rhys Nanmor (fl.1480–1513). More recently, from the 19th to the 20th centuries both Glaslyn and Carneddog lived in Nantmor. Currently Nantmor is still home to poets, including Nia Powell and Cynan Jones.
 John Williams (ca.1584 - ca.1627), goldsmith who worked for King James I was from Beddgelert, and donated a silver cup to the church in 1610.
 Marged ferch Ifan (1696–1793), Welsh harpist and wrestler, was born here.
 Alfred Bestall (1892–1986), one of the illustrators and storytellers of the comic strip character Rupert Bear, lived in the village for many years.

Beddgelert meteorite 

On 21 September 1949 a meteorite struck the Prince Llewelyn Hotel in the early hours of the morning, causing damage to the roof and a bedroom in the hotel. The following week the Caernarvon & Denbigh Herald reported the incident:

The proprietor of the hotel, a Mr Tillotson, subsequently sold half the meteorite to the British Museum and half to Durham University, which had placed an advertisement in the local papers asking for information and offering a reward for any recovered fragments of the meteorite.

There have only ever been two such verified meteorite falls in Wales: the Beddgelert incident, and an earlier incident fourteen miles away in Pontllyfni in 1931, at the other end of the Nantlle Ridge.

References 
Notes

Bibliography

External links 

Beddgelert Travel Guide 
Beddgelert Snowdonia Guide
www.geograph.co.uk : photos of Beddgelert and surrounding area

 
Villages in Gwynedd
Communities in Gwynedd